The Thai League Cup is a knock-out football tournament played in Thai sport. Some games are played as a single match, others are played as two-legged contests. The 2013 Thai League Cup kicked off on 2 February 2013 with the Bangkok & field regional qualifiers.

Calendar

First qualifying round

|colspan="3" style="background-color:#FF99FF"|Northern Region
|-
|colspan="3" style="background-color:#99CCCC"|2 February 2013

|-
|colspan="3" style="background-color:#99CCCC"|3 February 2013

|-
|colspan="3" style="background-color:#FF99FF"|North Eastern Region
|-
|colspan="3" style="background-color:#99CCCC"|2 February 2013

|-
|colspan="3" style="background-color:#99CCCC"|3 February 2013

|-
|colspan="3" style="background-color:#FF99FF"|Bangkok & field Region
|-
|colspan="3" style="background-color:#99CCCC"|3 February 2013

|-
|colspan="3" style="background-color:#FF99FF"|Central-West Region
|-
|colspan="3" style="background-color:#99CCCC"|2 February 2013

|-
|colspan="3" style="background-color:#FF99FF"|Central-East Region
|-
|colspan="3" style="background-color:#99CCCC"|3 February 2013

|-
|colspan="3" style="background-color:#FF99FF"|Southern Region
|-
|colspan="3" style="background-color:#99CCCC"|2 February 2013

|-

|}

Second qualifying round

|colspan="3" style="background-color:#FF99FF"|Northern Region
|-
|colspan="3" style="background-color:#99CCCC"|2 February 2013

|-
|colspan="3" style="background-color:#99CCCC"|3 February 2013

|-
|colspan="3" style="background-color:#FF99FF"|North Eastern Region
|-
|colspan="3" style="background-color:#99CCCC"|2 February 2013

|-
|colspan="3" style="background-color:#99CCCC"|3 February 2013

|}

First round

Second round

Third round

Quarter-finals

Semi-finals

Final 

2013 in Thai football cups
Thailand League Cup
2013
2013